Lake Murphy may refer to:

 Lake Murphy (Florida)
 Lake Murphy (Oregon)
 Lake Murphy (Washington)
 Lake Murphy (Colquitt_County, Georgia)

See also
Murphy Lake (disambiguation)